Rebellion is a 2009 Hong Kong action crime thriller film directed by Herman Yau and starring Shawn Yue, Elanne Kong and Chapman To.

Plot
Notorious of its unpeace, the South district (in Hong Kong island) is ruled by five gangs. The five leaders, Jimmy (Calvin Poon), Coffee (Paul Wong), Jupiter (Convoy Chan), Sand (Jun Kung) and Man Ching (Anson Leung) share the same power over the area. Seemingly, everything remains calm, each gang owning its territory and conflicts rarely rising in-between. However, as Jimmy's wife Cheung Wah (Ada Choi) is so talented in managing their business which has been expanding in recent years, gradually they are the most affluent among all. Adversely, Man Ching is facing down turn of his empire, business shrinking in scale and its power narrowing down.

While the gangs are active in underground trade, the police are desperately looking forward to just one chance. Now it is time for them to take a strike. One night, when Jimmy is dining with seniors, a young man armed himself with a gun fires several big shots to his head. Knowing that, Cheung Wah stops all business dealing at once and appoints Po (Shawn Yue), Jimmy's right hand, to dig out the backhand but keep things quiet. Meanwhile, as Jimmy is still in a coma, dispute spreads over the five gangs, grabbing this shot to override others' territories. Violence sprawling over the East district, bloodshed is inevitable.

With efforts Po finally drags the killer out from Sand's place. Cheung Wah flies back from Taiwan right away to take the lead. Wandering in the still street in the midnight, Po can sense the weirdness around where policemen are missing out unusually. In fact, they are already stationed at the airport and are expecting Wah's back. The battle between justice and darkness is about to begin.

Alternate ending
The Blu-ray Disc release of Rebellion included an alternate ending, which showed Cheung Wah as an undercover cop, differing from that of the original ending, which showed Cheung Wah being arrested at the end of the film. It also featured a different opening than that of the DVD version. Other differences from the movie includes the complete replacement of Po as the undercover cop with Cheung Wah, extended gang-fight scenes, and an extension in the scene where Po tries to gain entrance to Sand's territories.

Cast
 Shawn Yue as Po
 Elanne Kong as Ling
 Chapman To as Blackie
 Ron Heung as Chung
 Calvin Poon as Jimmy
 Ada Choi as Cheung Wah
 Convoy Chan as Jupiter
 Anson Leung as Man Ching
 Paul Wong as Coffee
 Jun Kung as Sand
 Ella Koon as Undercover cop
 Tommy Yuen as Chan Fai
 Parkman Wong as Police Senior Inspector
 Renee Dai as Lok
 Austin Wai as Mr. Tai
 Fung Hak-on as Uncle Man
 Bruce Law as Ducky

Production
Originally intended as a 100-minute film Category III rating, it was cut down to 87 minute IIB rating so there would be more viewers to watch the film. The content that was cut were foul languages from Shawn Yue, Chapman To, Paul Wong, and Convoy Chan, as well as several sexual scenes.

External links

Rebellion at the Hong Kong Movie Database
Rebellion at the Hong Kong Cinemagic

2009 action thriller films
2000s Cantonese-language films
2009 films
2009 crime thriller films
Hong Kong action thriller films
Hong Kong crime thriller films
Triad films
Films directed by Herman Yau
Films set in Hong Kong
Films shot in Hong Kong
2000s Hong Kong films